Joe Hildebrand is an Australian journalist, misogynist, television and radio presenter.

Hildebrand writes for Sydney's The Daily Telegraph and is also known to contribute to a number of other News Corp publications, including Melbourne's Herald Sun and news.com.au.

Early life and education
Hildebrand was born in Melbourne and grew up in Dandenong, in outer Melbourne. He attended Dandenong Primary School, Dandenong High School and the University of Melbourne, graduating with a Bachelor of Arts degree majoring in History and English, and edited the student newspaper Farrago. Before joining The Daily Telegraph, Hildebrand worked as the New South Wales political correspondent for Australian Associated Press, and also worked in London for the Press Association.

Career
Hildebrand was co-awarded the 2004 Human Rights print media award and a high commendation in the 2004 Walkley Awards for the report Stolen Wages Payback Shame.

Hildebrand appeared on the ABC's national talk program, Q&A, on 30 May 2011, 12 September 2011 and 10 August 2015. He has also made several appearances on the ABC's national current affairs program, The Drum, since December 2010. He has had a weekly spot on Channel Seven's The Morning Show as well as Sky News Australia talk program Paul Murray Live.

Hildebrand was the host of television series Dumb, Drunk and Racist, which debuted on ABC2 on Wednesday 20 June 2012. Dumb, Drunk and Racist followed Hildebrand and four Indian travellers around Australia to test whether the popular Indian perception of Australians as stupid, intoxicated bigots was correct. Early figures for the first episode had average audience numbers in the five capital cities alone at 266,000, with a peak of just under 320,000. He went on to host Shitsville Express which aired 2 July 2013 on ABC2.

In November 2013, Hildebrand joined Network Ten's new morning show Studio 10 as a panellist alongside Sarah Harris. He remained in this position until his resignation from the Network 10 in September 2020.

Hildebrand was the co-host of a national drive time radio program with Matt Tilley on Triple M from January to December 2014.

After his departure from Studio 10 in September 2020, Hildebrand joined Sydney's 2GB. He will be joining the John Stanley program with "The Daily Telegraph" segment. There are plans to expand his presence on the program over time.

Personal life
Hildebrand is married to journalist Tara Ravens. They have three children and live in Sydney.

When Hildebrand was ten years old, his younger brother Paddy went missing on a family bushwalk in Wilson's Promontory.  Paddy, who was autistic, was not found despite an extensive search and rescue operation and to this day what became of him remains a mystery.

Controversies
On 2 April 2014, Hildebrand apologised for remarks he had made during a panel discussion on Studio 10, prior to an interview by that program with Rosie Batty, whose ex-partner murdered their 11-year-old son.

On 18 June 2014, Hildebrand and Tilley did make comments on the show "The One Percenters" of Triple M radio. The phrase that generated the polemic was that "Everybody in Colombia, owns, sells and do cocaine". These comments resulted in an online campaign and a diplomatic letter from the Embassy of Colombia in Australia. The letter asked for an apology from the radio station and the radio commentators.

On 14 July 2014, Hildebrand was criticised on social media following comments he made on Twitter mentioning a television interview with Olympic swimmer Ian Thorpe that screened that night.

References

External links
Punch biography

1976 births
Living people
ABC News and Current Affairs
Journalists from Melbourne
Triple M presenters
People from Dandenong, Victoria
21st-century Australian journalists
Australian radio personalities
Australian television personalities
University of Melbourne alumni